The 6th Annual Interactive Achievement Awards is the 6th edition of the Interactive Achievement Awards, an annual awards event that honors the best games in the video game industry. The awards are arranged by the Academy of Interactive Arts & Sciences (AIAS) and were held at the Hard Rock Hotel and Casino in Las Vegas on 27 February 2003 as part of the academy's 2003 D.I.C.E. Summit. It was hosted by Dave Foley with presenters including Cliff Bleszinski, Xander Berkeley, Don James, Shigeru Miyamoto, Julie Benz, Blue Man Group, Tony Hawk, Ed Fries, Kelly Hu, David Jones, Nina Kaczorowski, Doug Lowenstein, Syd Mead, Mike Metzger, Vince Neil, Tommy Tallarico, Amy Weber and Victor Webster. It had musical performances by Unwritten Law and The Players Band.

Battlefield 1942 won the most awards, including Game of the Year. Metroid Prime received the most nominations. Electronic Arts received the most nominations and won the most awards.

Yu Suzuki received the Academy of Interactive Arts and Sciences Hall of Fame Award.

Winners and nominees
Winners are listed first, highlighted in boldface, and indicated with a double dagger.

Hall of Fame Award
 Yu Suzuki

Games with multiple nominations and awards

The following 23 games received multiple nominations:

The following six games received multiple awards:

Companies with multiple nominations

Companies that received multiple nominations as either a developer or a publisher.

Companies that received multiple awards as either a developer or a publisher.

References

External links
 Archived Winners/Finalists Page

2003 awards
2003 awards in the United States
February 2003 events in the United States
2002 in video gaming
D.I.C.E. Award ceremonies